We Are Together (Thina Simunye) is a British documentary film about the orphanage "Agape" in South Africa. Children, who live here, lost their parents to AIDS. The film is full of songs, both native and English. Eventually the children get a chance to visit New York City and raise money by singing for the public.

The film has won eight awards.

Cast 
Lorraine Bracco as herself
Alicia Keys as herself
Mbali as herself
Mthobisi Moya as himself
Nonkululeko Moya as herself
Sifiso Moya as himself
Slindile Moya as herself
Swaphiwe Moya as herself
'Grandma' Zodwa Mqadi as herself
Paul Simon as himself
Kanye West as himself

Awards 
Standard Life Audience Award, Edinburgh International Film Festival 2007
Cadillac Audience Award, Tribeca Film Festival 2007
Special Jury Prize, Tribeca Film Festival 2007
Audience Award, Amnesty International Film Festival 2007
All Rights Award, Amnesty International Film Festival 2007
Special Jury Prize, One World International Film Festival 2007
Audience Award, IDFA Amsterdam 2006
First Appearance Award, IDFA Amsterdam 2006

References

External links 
 Official site (archive)
 
 Review at IDFA
 Film information and the official trailer on Shooting People

2006 films
2006 documentary films
British documentary films
Documentary films about HIV/AIDS
Documentary films about orphanages
Zulu-language films
Films scored by Dario Marianelli
Films set in New York City
Films set in South Africa
2000s English-language films
HIV/AIDS in British films
2000s British films